Zhou Shouying (Chinese: 周守英; born 11 September 1969) is a female Chinese rower. She competed at 1988 Seoul Olympic Games. Together with her teammates, she won a silver medal in the women's coxed four and a bronze medal in the women's eight. She competed in the women's coxless four and the women's eight at the 1992 Summer Olympics and placed fourth and fifth, respectively.

References

Chinese female rowers
Rowers at the 1988 Summer Olympics
Rowers at the 1992 Summer Olympics
Olympic rowers of China
Olympic silver medalists for China
Olympic bronze medalists for China
Living people
1969 births
Olympic medalists in rowing
Asian Games medalists in rowing
Rowers at the 1990 Asian Games
Medalists at the 1988 Summer Olympics
Asian Games gold medalists for China
Medalists at the 1990 Asian Games
World Rowing Championships medalists for China
20th-century Chinese women
21st-century Chinese women